Catherine Meurisse (born February 8, 1980)  is a French illustrator, cartoonist, and comic strip author. She was elected to the Académie des Beaux-Arts on January 15, 2020. She is the first cartoonist to become a member of the Academy.

References

French illustrators
French women cartoonists
1980 births
Living people
Place of birth missing (living people)
Members of the Académie des beaux-arts
French women illustrators